Dr. Assad Sheikholeslami  (born in Sanandaj, Kurdistan Province, Iran) is a prominent theologian and professor at Tehran University.

Biography 

Dr. Sheikholeslami was an advisor to President Mohammad Khatami during his 8 years of presidency with the focus on the issues related to the Sunni population of Iran. He was also a chairman at Tehran University.

He is a Sunni Kurd. Dr. Sheikholeslami is the author of two books on Kalam and continues to teach and advise graduate students at Tehran University. He is also a member of the advisory board for all universities in the western region of Iran.

References 

21st-century Muslim theologians
Iranian scholars
Iranian Kurdish people
Kurdish theologians
People from Sanandaj
Academic staff of the University of Tehran
Year of birth missing (living people)
Living people